The 1946 Wilberforce Green Wave football team was an American football team that represented Wilberforce University in the Midwest Athletic Association (MAA) during the 1946 college football season. In its 11th season under head coach Gaston F. Lewis, the team compiled a 5–2–2 record. Wilberforce was invited to play in three bowl games (Angel Bowl, Cattle Bowl, and Tobacco Bowl), rejected the Cattle and Tobacco Bowl bids, and accepted the bid to play in the Angel Bowl, but its acceptance was made several days too late.

The Dickinson System rated Wilberforce as the No. 4 black college football team for 1946, behind No. 1 Tennessee A&I, No. 2 Morgan State, and No. 3 Tuskegee.

Schedule

References

Wilberforce State
Central State Marauders football seasons
Wilberforce State Green Wave football